Lawrence Muganga is a Ugandan-Canadian scholar, digital economy educationist, academic administrator who serves as the Vice Chancellor of Victoria University Uganda. He is the author of You Can't Make Fish Climb Trees as well "Aunthetic University".

Background and education
He was born in Butaleja District and grew up in Masaka District. He completed his O Level from Mende Kalema Secondary School and A level from St. Charles Lwanga Kasasa Secondary School in Masaka District. He holds a Bachelor of Social Sciences in Economics and a Master of Arts in Economic Policy Management from Makerere University Uganda. He graduated with a Higher Education Teaching Certificate from Harvard University Cambridge, Massachusetts. He holds a Master in Education specialising in Adult Education plus a PhD in Educational Administration and Leadership from University of Alberta Canada. He holds a dual citizenship of Uganda and Canada.

Career
After his graduation from Makerere University in 2002, Muganga moved to Rwanda and worked in Rwanda Revenue Authority as an Internal Auditor (2003–2005). 
He worked as a Project Manager at Edmonton Multicultural Coalition, he also served as a Policy Advisor for the Government of Alberta in Canada. Muganga has held several teaching, consulting and professional positions in Canada, Ethiopia, Rwanda, Finland, Singapore, Sweden, US and Solomon Islands majorly focusing on researching, planning, developing, implementing, and assessing policies that contribute towards human capital development and improving the quality of life for populations.
In 2020, he was appointed as the new Vice Chancellor for Victoria University Uganda.

Research
He has published the finding of his educational research in educational journals and other peer publications.

Grant
In 2019, Muganga published a book called "You Can't Make Fish Climb Trees" and won a grant of $1.3 million from the Bill and Melinda Gates Foundation.

Controversies
On 2 September 2021, he was arrested by the Ugandan joint security forces for espionage and illegal stay in the country but he was freed 2 days later without any charge.

References

External links

Victoria University Cuts Tuition Fees for New Entrants :

Muhoozi’s Rwanda mission
Uganda: Victoria University Explains 'Bad Black' Ambassadorial Job

10 creative and innovative teens across the country to receive scholarships

1976 births
Living people
Vice-chancellors of universities in Uganda
Academic staff of Makerere University
People from Central Region, Uganda
University of Alberta alumni